Sir Malcolm Stevenson  (15 March 1878 – 27 November 1927) was a British colonial administrator. He served as the Governor of Cyprus, and later as the Governor of the Seychelles.

Stevenson was born in Lisburn, Ireland, and educated at Methodist College Belfast and Trinity College Dublin, from which he graduated in 1901.  He entered the Ceylon Civil Service in that year, rising to Second Assistant Colonial Secretary in May 1911. From December 1912 to October 1913 he was seconded to the Colonial Office in London, but then returned to Ceylon as private secretary to Governor Sir Robert Chalmers. In 1914 he married Chalmers's daughter, Mabel, and in 1915 he was promoted to Principal Assistant Colonial Secretary.

In May 1917, Stevenson was appointed Chief Secretary of Cyprus, in which post he administered the government from November 1918 to August 1920, when he was appointed High Commissioner. In May 1925, when Cyprus was given the status of a Crown Colony, he became the first Governor, holding the post until November 1926. In May 1927, he was appointed Governor of the Seychelles, but died suddenly just six months later.

Stevenson was appointed Companion of the Order of St Michael and St George (CMG) in the 1920 New Year Honours and Knight Commander of the Order of St Michael and St George (KCMG) in the 1923 Birthday Honours.

He died on 27 November 1927 in the Seychelles.

Footnotes

References

Obituary, The Times, 28 November 1927

1878 births
1927 deaths
People from Lisburn
Alumni of Trinity College Dublin
Colonial Administrative Service officers
Governors of British Cyprus
Governors of British Seychelles
Irish knights
Knights Commander of the Order of St Michael and St George
People educated at Methodist College Belfast
Colonial Secretaries of Cyprus
Deaths in Seychelles